AIMStar was a proposed antimatter-catalyzed nuclear pulse propulsion craft that uses clouds of antiprotons to initiate fission and fusion within fuel pellets. A magnetic nozzle derives motive force from the resulting explosions. The design was studied during the 1990s by Penn State University. The craft was designed to reach a distance on the order of 10,000 AU from the Sun, with a travel time of 50 years, and a coasting velocity of approximately 960 km/s after the boost phase (roughly 1/300th of the speed of light). The probe would be able to study the interstellar medium as well as reach Alpha Centauri. The project would require more antimatter than we are capable of producing. In addition, some technical hurdles need to be surpassed before it would be feasible.

See also
ICAN-II - A similar concept that uses less antimatter but more fission propellant
Nuclear pulse propulsion

References

External links
Antimatter (PSU)

Alpha Centauri
Cancelled spacecraft
Nuclear spacecraft propulsion
Interstellar travel